Wayne Township is one of thirteen townships in Tippecanoe County, Indiana, United States. As of the 2010 census, its population was 1,580 and it contained 623 housing units.

Geography

Unincorporated communities
 Glenhall at 
 Westpoint at 
(This list is based on USGS data and may include former settlements.)

Adjacent townships
 Shelby Township (north)
 Wabash Township (northeast)
 Union Township (east)
 Jackson Township (south)
 Davis Township, Fountain County (southwest)
 Warren Township, Warren County (west)

Cemeteries
The township contains these three cemeteries: Granville, Marks and Sherry.

Major highways
  Indiana State Road 25

School JDH,Glen Hall 24 
 Tippecanoe School Corporation

Political districts
 Indiana's 4th congressional district
 State House District 41
 State Senate District 22

References

External links
 Indiana Township Association
 United Township Association of Indiana

Townships in Tippecanoe County, Indiana
Lafayette metropolitan area, Indiana
Townships in Indiana